Graeme Miller (born 21 February 1973) is a Scottish former professional footballer who played as a striker.

Career
Born in Glasgow, Miller began his career with Tynecastle, before turning professional with Hibernian in 1992. He later played for Berwick Rangers, making a total of 9 appearances in the Scottish Football League for both clubs, before dropping down to junior football to play with Edinburgh United.

Personal life
His father Alex and brother Greg have also been professional footballers.

External links

1973 births
Living people
Scottish footballers
Tynecastle F.C. players
Hibernian F.C. players
Berwick Rangers F.C. players
Edinburgh United F.C. players
Scottish Football League players
Association football forwards